Liushan is a town in Nanzhao County, Nanyang, in Henan province, China. , it administers Jianshe Residential Neighborhood and the following 20 villages:
Dagou Village
Shangguan Village
Linglongshan Village
Mawan Village
Xiaguan Village
Xilin'an Village
Tumen Village
Zhangzhuang Village
Youfang Village
Haohan Village
Xijie Village
Dongjie Village
Guopaidian Village
Panzhai Village
Shilingwan Village
Chuwan Village
Guanpo Village
Huanglian Village
Hezhuang Village
Yangba Village

References

Towns in Nanyang, Henan
Nanzhao County